Rain on the Roof may refer to:
Rain on the Roof, a 1980 television drama by Dennis Potter
Rain on the Roof (album), a 1996 album by Andy Irvine
Rain on the Roof (song), a 1966 single by the Lovin' Spoonful